"Tell Me Baby" is a song from the Red Hot Chili Peppers' ninth studio album Stadium Arcadium. The song was released as the follow-up to the hit single "Dani California" on July 17, 2006. The single was not as successful as their prior single "Dani California" nor their next single "Snow (Hey Oh)" as far as chart success, but did reach number                              one on the Billboard Modern Rock chart and remained there for four weeks making it the band's second straight number one on that chart from Stadium Arcadium and tenth number one overall.

Composition
"Tell Me Baby" incorporates both the old funk rock sound from their Blood Sugar Sex Magik days in the verses of the song, and the chorus focuses on the more melodic sound found on more recent Chili Peppers albums. The song is about the dreams of pilgrims in Los Angeles who want to obtain fame and fortune.

Reception
Nick Mitchell at The Skinny gave the song three out of five stars, stating "Neither particularly complex nor memorable, "Tell Me Baby" is nevertheless an upbeat little number that may well ingratiate itself on your eardrums."

Music video
The music video for "Tell Me Baby" was directed by Jonathan Dayton and Valerie Faris, a directing duo that has worked on many other Chili Peppers videos. Flea said, "It's the best [video] we ever did." For the video, Dayton and Faris interviewed and auditioned people who originally came to California to achieve some sort of fame and people who play music just for the sake of playing music. During the callback for the auditioned people, their second audition was filmed and the members of the Chili Peppers surprisingly entered the room during auditions to join in playing along. The music video for "Tell Me Baby" is to represent how awkward auditions are and how hard it is to make it in the music business.

Live performances
"Tell Me Baby" was performed often on the Stadium Arcadium World Tour and has been featured on all the tours that followed.

Formats and track listings
CD version 1 5439 15673-2
 "Tell Me Baby" – 4:07
 "A Certain Someone" – 2:25

CD version 2 9362 42956-2
 "Tell Me Baby" – 4:07
 "Mercy Mercy" – 4:01
 "Lyon 6.6.06" (Live) – 3:53

7" Picture Disc 5439 15973-2
 "Tell Me Baby" – 4:07
 "Mercy Mercy" – 4:01

Personnel
Red Hot Chili Peppers
Anthony Kiedis – lead vocals
John Frusciante – guitar, backing vocals, keyboard
Flea – bass
Chad Smith – drums, percussion, piano

Charts

Weekly charts

Year-end charts

References

Red Hot Chili Peppers songs
2006 singles
Song recordings produced by Rick Rubin
Music videos directed by Jonathan Dayton and Valerie Faris